Hangvar SK is a Swedish football club located in Hangvar on the island of Gotland.

Background
Hangvar SK currently plays in Division 4 Gotland which is the sixth tier of Swedish football. They play their home matches at the Skogsgläntan in Hangvar.

The club is affiliated to Gotlands Fotbollförbund. Hangvar SK have competed in the Svenska Cupen on 5 occasions and have played 6 matches in the competition.

Season to season

Footnotes

External links
 Hangvar SK – Official website
 Hangvar SK on Facebook

Football clubs in Gotland County